Hunters in the Snow is a 1981 short story by Tobias Wolff centered on the suburbs of Spokane and featured in In the Garden of the North American Martyrs.  The story deals with three characters hunting together in the woods; Kenny, who is hard and brutal; Tub, who is fat, a target of ridicule, and lags behind the rest of the party; and Frank, who is the most "frank" of the group. Each character has a distinct personality which changes as the story progresses. The story reaches its climax when Tub shoots Kenny in what appears to be an accident. Tub and Frank seem to be taking Kenny to a hospital, but wind up stopping in a diner and a roadhouse in a strange chain of events. The story ends with them driving in a direction that is opposite to the one of the hospital. This story's title refers to the painting Hunters in the Snow by Pieter Bruegel the Elder.

Themes 
Self-absorption

Each of the major characters (Frank, Tub, and Kenny) displays a significant lack of concern for others at some point in the story. At the beginning of the story, we read about Kenny's reckless driving and witness a small exchange of mockery among the characters. The characters travel through the woods, hunting, and after tracking a deer, arrive at a house. Upon requesting permission to hunt on the property of the house, unknown to Frank and Tub, Kenny is personally asked to shoot the landowner's dog. After he completes the task, he jokingly threatens to shoot Tub and in return is actually shot by Tub who truly believed he was in danger. Frank and Tub decide to take Kenny to the hospital. On the way to the hospital, we learn that Frank is planning on leaving his wife and children for 'true love'. After confessing this to Tub, Tub reveals his secret as well—gluttony. They stopped at a restaurant and Frank orders several orders of pancakes for Tub, allowing him to indulge in his gluttony. They get back into the truck and start driving away from the hospital.

References

1981 short stories
American short stories